Boynton is a town in Muskogee County, Oklahoma, United States. The population was 248 at the 2010 census, a 9.5 percent decline from the figure of 274 recorded in 2000.

History
Boynton was built in 1903 with the coming of the St. Louis – San Francisco Railway to the Muscogee (Creek) Nation.  The post office was named for E. L. Boynton, chief engineer of the Missouri Coal and Railroad Company. Boosted by an oil refinery and a brick factory, the town reached a peak population of 1,400 in the 1920 census.  By 2000 the population had declined to 274.  The local school district, Boynton-Moton Public Schools, closed its high school in September 2010; in March 2011, the Oklahoma State Board of Education voted to revoke the district's accreditation and close the lower school as of June 2011.

Geography
Boynton is located at  (35.649404, -95.653678).

Demographics

As of the census of 2000, there were 274 people, 112 households, and 76 families residing in the town. The racial makeup of the town was 27.37% White, 55.11% African American, 6.20% Native American, 0.36% from other races, and 10.95% from two or more races. Hispanic or Latino of any race were 0.73% of the population.

There were 112 households, out of which 33.9% had children under the age of 18 living with them, 39.3% were married couples living together, 21.4% had a female householder with no husband present, and 32.1% were non-families. 31.3% of all households were made up of individuals, and 16.1% had someone living alone who was 65 years of age or older. The average household size was 2.45 and the average family size was 3.09.

In the town, the population was spread out, with 30.3% under the age of 18, 9.9% from 18 to 24, 21.9% from 25 to 44, 21.9% from 45 to 64, and 16.1% who were 65 years of age or older. The median age was 36 years. For every 100 females, there were 107.6 males. For every 100 females age 18 and over, there were 101.1 males.

The median income for a household in the town was $17,917, and the median income for a family was $25,000. Males had a median income of $25,417 versus $15,417 for females. The per capita income for the town was $18,419. About 22.4% of families and 25.5% of the population were below the poverty line, including 29.6% of those under the age of eighteen and 13.0% of those 65 or over.

Economy
The local economy is based on agricultural services.

References

External links
 Encyclopedia of Oklahoma History and Culture - Boynton

Towns in Muskogee County, Oklahoma
Towns in Oklahoma